Gollis University (GU) is a privately owned university in Hargeisa, the capital of  Somaliland  It is situated near the Golis Mountains.

Overview
Gollis University serves the Hargeisa Region and receives students from portions of the other five regions. It was founded in 2004 as a non-profit institution, opened to students for enrollment in 2005, and was upgraded to a university within 10 months of its opening. Starting with 40 criminal justice and 40 civil engineering students, the student population reached 706 at the end of 2007.

The university operates one campus at Hargeisa, the second capital of Somalia.  The tuition fees from students (approximately $400.00/student/year) are the main source of income for the University.

The university has established the Gollis University Research Institute (GURI). GURI promotes the delivery of research across all faculties and departments of Gollis University. It also promotes and coordinates research projects with other organizations, including higher education institutes, NGOs, professional organizations, and international organizations.

Campuses
The university has several campuses in the region, including:
Hargeisa Campus (Main Campus)
Berbera Campus
Burao Campus
Erigavo Campus
Las Anod Campus
Buuhoodle Campus.
Garowe Campus.

Undergraduate programs:
 Faculty of Engineering:
 Bachelor of Civil engineering 
 Bachelor of Telecommunication engineering
 Bachelor of Electrical engineering
 Bachelor of Computer engineering
 Bachelor of Industrial Engineering
 Faculty of Information Communication Technology
Faculty of  Management & Economics:
Bachelor of Business Management
Bachelor of Accounting and Finance
Bachelor of Economics
Bachelor of Business Information Technology
 Faculty of Geology & Water Resources
 Faculty of Agriculture
 Faculty of Veterinary Medicine
 Faculty of Medicine & Allied Health Sciences:
Medicine
Public Health
Nutrition
Clinical Laboratory 
Anesthesia 
Clinical Officers
 Faculty of Social and Behavioral Science:
Bachelor Development Studies 
Bachelor of Social Science
Bachelor of Political Science and International Relations
 Faculty of Law.
 Faculty of Islamic Studies and Sharia
 Faculty of Education
 Faculty of Applied Statistics

Postgraduate Master Degree programs
Master of Business Administration (MBA)
Master of Development studies (MDS)
Master of Engineering Management (MEM)
Master of Science in Telecommunication Engineering.
Master of Public Administration & Policy Making.
Master of Conflict Resolution & Peace Building.
Master of Project Management.
Master of Engineering Management.
Master of Public Health.

References

External links
Official website 

Universities in Somaliland
Universities in Somalia
2004 establishments in Somalia
Educational institutions established in 2004